Thomas Dux Grocer, also known as Thomas Dux, was an Australian chain of gourmet grocery stores operated by Woolworths from 2008 to 2017.

It sold a range of local and imported fresh foods and grocery items. Products included fresh fruit and vegetables, dairy products, artisan-style baked breads, oils and vinegars, pasta and sauces, condiments, prepared meals, chocolate products, fresh meat and fresh flowers. Thomas Dux specialised in organic, gluten-free, preservative-free and free-range foods. Local boutique suppliers included Saskia Beer, Maggie Beer, Simmone Logue, Herbies, Ornella, Phillippa's, Rowie's, Brasserie Bread, Irrewarra, Phillippa's and Geoff Jansz. Fruit and vegetables were sourced directly from the wholesale markets in Sydney and Melbourne on a daily basis.

History
Woolworths launched Thomas Dux, an upmarket grocery store, in April 2008 with the first store in the Sydney suburb of Lane Cove followed by another in Paddington.

In May 2009, Woolworths announced the acquisition of eight boutique grocery store leases in Crows Nest, Hornsby and Mona Vale in Sydney, and Armadale, Black Rock, Glen Waverley, Port Melbourne and Richmond in Melbourne from Macro Wholefoods, with the intention to rebadge the stores under the Thomas Dux brand. The first of the rebadged stores opened in August 2009.

From 2014, Woolworths started closing some stores, with speculation that the entire chain would be sold or closed.

In September 2014, Woolworths closed the Thomas Dux store in Surry Hills. The lease on the store was sold to About Life, a Sydney-based gourmet grocer. The Surry Hills store was the first of four leases Woolworths would ultimately sell to About Life by 2016.

In May 2015 the Richmond store was sold to Little Group Projects, which then demolished it and built a 13-story apartment building on the land dubbed "Dux Richmond Hill". In January 2016 the Glen Waverley store was closed, and throughout the remainder of 2016 Thomas Dux's Hornsby store in was closed, while its Crows Nest, Lane Cove and Port Melbourne outlets were taken over by About Life.

In 2017 the four remaining Thomas Dux stores were closed. The two remaining Melbourne locations, Black Rock  and Armadale, as well as the Paddington store  were rebranded as Woolworths Metro stores. The Mona Vale store was taken over by Flannerys. As of December 2017, Thomas Dux has ceased trading altogether. In 2021 the former Thomas Dux site at Black Rock was closed, and is believed to be reopening as a BWS or Dan Murphy's liquor outlet.

As at June 2021, Woolworths continued to sell limited gourmet products like cheese under the Thomas Dux brand. This was similar to after buying Macro Wholefoods and closing their stores, but keeping the brand alive as a healthier food range on Woolworths shelves.

References

External links

Retail companies established in 2008
Retail companies disestablished in 2017
Woolworths Group (Australia)
2008 establishments in Australia
2017 disestablishments in Australia
Defunct supermarkets of Australia